Paul Morgan Genge (March 29, 1913, in Brooklyn, New York – May 13, 1988, in Los Angeles, California) was an actor from the 1950s through to the late 1970s.

Early years 
Genge's parents were Mr. and Mrs. Edward C. Genge. During World War II he served in the United States Army Air Corps. While he was stationed at Geiger Field in 1942 he acted with the Little Theater in Spokane, Washington.

Film and television 
Genge is most famous for his role as the shotgun toting gray-haired mob hitman 'Mike' in the 1968 film Bullitt (his character is the passenger in the black 1968 Dodge Charger during the famous car chase that goes out of control and causes his death and the driver's).  Other film roles include that of a payoff man in The Outfit (1973), a California Highway Patrol officer in 1967's Hot Rods to Hell, Whitey, a communist suspect in The FBI Story (1959) and Lieutenant Hagerman in Alfred Hitchcock's North By Northwest (1959). He also appeared on many television shows from the 1950s, 1960s, and 1970s. He played in four episodes of Perry Mason, starring Raymond Burr; in three of the roles he played a law-enforcement officer, such as San Francisco Inspector Wade in "The Case of the Poison Pen Pal" in 1962. In his final appearance in 1966 he played Bud in "The Case of the Sausalito Sunrise." In that episode he and his comrade, in attempting to hijack goods from a truck driven by Paul Drake, are killed when their car loses control and rolls down the cliff, somewhat similar to the chase scene in Bullitt.

Stage
Genge was a member of a touring company that presented Hamlet in 19 cities in the United States in 1937. He had the title role in the Barter Theatre's production of King Henry IV in 1939. In 1940 he acted with the Playwrights' Company in Brooklyn. In addition to acting on stage, Genge directed Hamlet in Hartford, Connecticut. He also wrote two plays, How to Fix an Ice Box and The Last Minstrel, that were produced. An advocate for regional theater. he financed a bus tour of the United States in 1963 to promote regional theater. He encouraged theatrical groups within a region to cooperate to find new plays to present. Genge's Broadway credits included Panic (1935), Hamlet (1936), Journey to Jerusalem (1940), Romeo and Juliet (1951) and Bernardine (1952).

Personal life
Genge married Rowena Kirkpatrick in Warrenton, Virginia, on November 28, 1944.

Filmography

Notes

External links
 
 
 

1913 births
1988 deaths
American male film actors
20th-century American male actors
American male stage actors
Broadway theatre people